Rabigato is a white Portuguese wine grape variety that is popularly grown in the Douro Region especially Douro Superior.

References

Grape varieties